Stenoptilia albilimbata is a moth of the family Pterophoridae. It is known from Japan (Honshu).

The length of the forewings is 12–14 mm.

External links
Taxonomic And Biological Studies Of Pterophoridae Of Japan (Lepidoptera)
Japanese Moths

albilimbata
Moths of Japan
Moths described in 1963